Maria Albertina Pinto Machado (born 25 December 1961) is a Portuguese long-distance runner. She competed in the women's marathon at the 1996 Summer Olympics.

She is mother of Mariana Machado.

References

External links
 

1961 births
Living people
Athletes (track and field) at the 1984 Summer Olympics
Athletes (track and field) at the 1988 Summer Olympics
Athletes (track and field) at the 1996 Summer Olympics
Portuguese female long-distance runners
Portuguese female marathon runners
Olympic athletes of Portugal
People from Sabrosa
Sportspeople from Vila Real District